The  is a limited express train service in Japan operated by Central Japan Railway Company (JR Central), which runs between Shizuoka and Kōfu. Since October 1995, it has been branded as Wide View Fujikawa, following the introduction of new 373 series EMUs replacing the previous 165 series trains.

History
The  was introduced on 20 March 1956 as a "Semi express" train running between Fuji and Kōfu using 80 series 4-car EMUs. From 1 October 1964, this was extended to run to and from Shizuoka.

From 5 March 1966, the service between Shizuoka and Kōfu was upgraded to "Express" status. From 15 March 1972, the 80 series EMUs were replaced by 165 series EMUs displaced by the opening of the Sanyō Shinkansen.

From 1 October 1995, the service was upgraded to become a Limited express following introduction of new 373 series EMU trains.

From 18 March 2007, all cars were made no-smoking.

Stops

Trains stop at the following stations:

 –  –  –  –  –  –  –  –  –  –  –  –

Service
Like all JR Central limited express trains, a limited express fee has to be paid, on top of the normal fee to ride this service. Services are formed of 3-car 373 series EMUs. There are 7 return workings a day, with the journey time taking approximately 2 hours 30 minutes from Shizuoka to Kōfu. Trains operate at a maximum speed of 110 km/h (68 mph).

Facilities
Only standard class is available on this service. Seat reservations can be made for an additional fee. There are no catering facilities available, though restrooms are available on this train.

References

Named passenger trains of Japan
Central Japan Railway Company
Minobu Line
Tōkaidō Main Line
Railway services introduced in 1956
1956 establishments in Japan